The Ministry of Innovation and Technology (MinT) (formerly known as the Ministry of Science and Technology (MoST), Ministry of Communication & Information Technology, Ministry of Science and Technology) is an Ethiopian government agency responsible for science and technological development in Ethiopia as well as a governing body of communications. It was established as a commission in December 1975 by directive No.62/1975.

Ministers
 October 2018 February 2020: Dr.-Ing. Getahun Mekuria
 February 2020 October 2021: Dr Abraham Belay
 October 2021present: Dr. Belete Molla

History
The Ministry of Science and Technology (MoST) was a governmental institution that was established for the first time in December 1975 by proclamation No.62/1975 as a commission. Following the change in government in 1991 and with the issuance of the new economic policy, the commission was re-established in March 1994 by Proclamation No.91/94. The commission went into its third phase of re-institution on 24 August 1995 by Proclamation No.7/1995, as an agency following the establishment of the Federal Democratic Republic of Ethiopia . The ministry changed its title to Ministry of Innovation and Technology in October 2018.

Vision
To see Ethiopia entrench the capacities which enable rapid learning, adaptation and utilization of effective foreign technologies by the year 2022/23.

It has a mission of coordinating, encouraging and supporting science and technology activities that realize the country's social and economic developments

Affiliate organizations
 Ethiopian Technology and Innovation Institute
 Ethiopian Radiation and Protection Authority
 Ethiopian Space Science and Technology Institute
 Ethiopian Biotechnology Institute
 Geospatial Information Institute

References 

Government ministries of Ethiopia
Innovation ministries